Frog is a 1987 American made-for-television fantasy-comedy film produced for the PBS series WonderWorks, starring Scott Grimes, Shelley Duvall, and Elliott Gould.

The central character Arlo Anderson (played by Scott Grimes) is an unpopular youth who is obsessed with his collection of lizards and amphibians. Despite his room already being covered in terrariums & tanks, Arlo cannot pass up the purchase of a large frog seen at a local pet shop. The large frog, the pet shop's recent acquisition from Italy, is named Gus and he fascinates Arlo. Arlo slipped Gus into his pocket, as he was on the way to a date at the local movie theatre. The date went smoothly until Gus escaped Arlo's pocket and began hopping around onto various girls at the theatre, scaring many & causing a near-panic. Later, after getting Gus home, Arlo is shocked to hear the frog speak to him. Gus explains that he was an Italian prince who was cursed into a frog hundreds of years ago. He believes that only a kiss from a beautiful girl can break the curse, so he & Arlo make a deal to get a kiss for Gus.

Along the way, Gus teaches Arlo how to socialize and woo women by being romantic. As a result, Arlo starts becoming friends with a girl he likes named Suzy, asking her to be his partner for the upcoming science fair. Throughout their preparation for the fair, several awkward situations occur involving Gus, who is impatient to get his kiss and/or not be treated like a frog. Arlo's parents begin to think their son needs psychiatric help, as they keep hearing him talk to himself (really to Gus) while in his bedroom. Whereas Suzy originally agreed to be Arlo's partner so that she could get a good grade in the Science Fair, she begins to actually like him as they spend more time together. At one point, Gus serenades the two with the song "That's Amore" (with Suzy only later learning it was Gus doing the singing).

During the Science Fair, a series of events leads to Suzy eventually learning that Gus can speak. In order to help Arlo win (his project is on how frogs communicate), Gus gets to the microphone of the school announcement system and calls for frogs to show up... by the dozens. The fair turns to pandemonium, but Suzy figures it out and forces Arlo to explain everything. She agrees to try kissing Gus, but following the incident at the Science Fair Arlo had let him go near a pond after the two had an argument. Arlo & Suzy sneak out & rush to the pond but do not know which frog is Gus, so Suzy begins picking up and kissing all of the frogs. After a few minutes of this, the kids are interrupted by an officer sent out to look for them. As the police car pulls away, a spot in the pond begins bubbling.

After Arlo's project is praised by the judges of the Science Fair (they showed up at his house with the trophy and immense praise for his ability to "communicate" with frogs), the family takes he and Suzy out to eat as celebration. While eating at a local Italian restaurant, a small man comes out onto the stage and says he's going to sing a very special song for two very special people there tonight. As he begins singing "That's Amore", both Arlo and Suzy freeze and look up towards the camera, realizing that the kiss worked and Gus is now the man on the stage.

A sequel to the movie titled Frogs! followed in 1991.

Cast 
 Scott Grimes: Arlo Anderson 
 Shelley Duvall: Annie Anderson
 Elliott Gould: Bill Anderson
 Paul Williams: Gus
 Amy Lynne: Suzy
 Elizabeth Berkley: Kathy
 Hal Sparks: Jim

References

External links
Frog at the Internet Movie Database

1987 television films
1987 films
1980s fantasy comedy films
American television films
American fantasy comedy films
1980s American films